Abd al-Wahhab al-Bayati (December 19, 1926 – August 3, 1999) was an Iraqi Arab poet. He was a pioneer in his field and defied conventional forms of poetry that had been common for centuries.

Biography
He was born in Baghdad, near the shrine of the 12th century Sufi Abdel Qadir al-Jilani. Abd al-Wahhab's last name should not be spelled as "Al-Bayyati" (double yy), in Arabic or when being transliterated for another language, as the meaning would change and become one of "the boarder" or "the pupil of a boarding school." This is a common mistake made with the last name Al-Bayati, even in Arabic, as it is assumed to be a name whose root (ba ya ta / ب ي ت) has Arabic origins, and therefore is expected to follow the Arabic faʿʿaal / فعَّال noun type, used to denote intensity, repetition or a profession. The name of Al-Bayati denotes one who comes from the Bayat tribe (قبيلة بيات), one of the largest Turkmen tribes in Iraq, entering the area with the Oghuz Turk migrations of the 9th–12th centuries C.E. In Iraq, although Al-Bayatis know of the tribal source of their name, it does not necessarily indicate a linguistic or cultural identity, as the Bayat tribe there is largely Arabised, through intermarriage and linguistic assimilation.

As a man of the city, he lived close to the political heartbeat most of his life—one of his friends, Ahmed Abdel-Moeti Hegazi, said urban centers of "hotels and institutions, cafés and airports" were actually his temporary residences. London, Moscow, Madrid and Baghdad are all represented in his poetry. He attended Baghdad University, and became a teacher after graduating from Dar Al-Mu'allimin (the Teacher's College) in 1950, the same year that he released his first collection of poems, Mala'ika wa Shayatin (Angels and Devils). In addition to teaching in public schools, al-Bayati also edited the popular and widely circulated cultural magazine Al-Thaqafa A-Jadida (The New Culture). In 1954 he left Iraq after being dismissed from his positions because of his radical communist political views and anti-government activity, and moved to Damascus. Although he returned to Damascus at the end of his life, his early wanderings also took him to Cairo, Beirut and a number of Western capitals. Always involved in world affairs, some of al-Bayati's poems are in fact addressed to international figures such as T.S. Eliot and Che Guevara. Not much information is available about his personal life. Before his exile, he married, but his wife and four children are mentioned only in passing in the few available biographies. This may be because they remained in Iraq after his departure.

After spending four years living in exile in Lebanon, Syria and Egypt, al-Bayati returned to Iraq in 1958 after a military coup d'état during which Crown Prince Abdul Illah and his nephew King Faisal were assassinated. The new republican government gave him a post in the Ministry of Education, after which he went to Moscow as a cultural attache representing the Iraqi embassy. Al-Bayati resigned from this post in 1961, but did not return to Iraq right away. He continued to live in Russia, teaching at the Asian and African People's Institute of the Soviet Academy of Sciences. He stayed in Eastern Europe, traveling often, and returned briefly to Iraq in 1964, only to move to Cairo within the year. In the mid-1970s Al-Bayati moved between Cairo, Paris, London, Madrid, Jeddah and Delphi, never staying in one place long but always returning to the Middle East. For the remainder of his life, Al-Bayati moved between his homeland and the rest of the world. "I've always searched for the sun's springs," he said, "When a human being stays in one place, he's likely to die. People too stagnate like water and air. Therefore the death of nature, of words, of the spirit has prompted me to keep travelling, so as to encounter new suns, new springs, new horizons. A whole new world being born."

Although Al-Bayati was philosophical about his wandering, it was not solely a personal choice. His communist politics made trouble for him throughout his whole life. When the pan-Arab, socialist Ba'ath Party took control of Iraq from the 'Arif party in 1968, Al-Bayati returned home only to flee a brutal campaign against liberals a few years later. He returned in 1972 to receive honors from the new government, and in 1980 was again assigned as a cultural attaché and was sent by Saddam Hussein to the embassy in Madrid. When Hussein's government invaded Kuwait in 1990, Al-Bayati left Spain and took refuge in Jordan and later Syria. In 1995, Hussein revoked his citizenship as punishment for Al-Bayati's participation in a Saudi Arabian cultural festival. Al-Bayati's difficulty with Iraq over the course of his life became the subject of much of his writing. There is a story that he once explained it by drawing comparisons between his relationship with Iraq and the story of Prometheus. "Of course," Al-Bayati said, "my relations with Iraqi governments were never conciliatory. I belong to the Iraqi people. I cannot separate myself from the people." He died in exile, apparently without any previously diagnosed illness, in Damascus on August 3, 1999.

Al-Bayati as a Refugee 
Due to his revolutionary ideas and advocacy for oppressed people, Abdul Wahab Al Bayati spent more than half of his life in exile. This gives a bitter flavor even to his love poetry. Following is from his The Impossible:

With dawn it comes or does not come,
My love that took to stony silence,
Round the walls it goes, begging,
Torn by talons of death whenever
Out of the death and gnawed by despair
It shouts: O you, creature you!
The Ship of Fate moved on, 
Sinbad of the Wind never came, 
How was it you came when our wells 
Are poisoned, where can you have come from?
Did we meet before I came to be?"

With total despair, he speaks about the tormenting pain of exile. Following is his poem entitled Why Are We in Exile the Refugees Ask (translated from Arabic by Abdullah Al-Udhari):
		
Why do we die?
In silence
And I had a house
And I had ….
And here you are
Without a heart without a voice
Waiting, and here you are
Why are we in exile?
We die
We die in silence
Why are we not crying?
On fire,
On thorns
We walked 
And my people walked
Why are we Lord?
Without a country, without love
We die
We die in terror
Why are we in exile?
Why are we lord?

The Sufi and Leftist Inspirations 
Al-Bayati has intensively been influenced by the Middle Eastern Sufi figures for their visionary values and passionate love. He was fascinated by the love of Satan for God elaborated by some Sufi masters like Imam Ahmad A-Ghazali. This is an unconditional love in which the lover approaches his beloved as par excellence and cannot see any rival for Him. On example is a poem by Al-Bayati entitled A’isha's Mad Lover in his book, Love Poems on the Seven Gates of the World (1971): “In this context Al-Bayati’s poetry becomes Sufi in default, since he assumes the position as a modernist whose aspirations for an earthy paradise have not materialized.”

Al-Bayati's communist ideology prompted him to make close friendship with the Turkish poet and playwright Nazim Hikmat (1902-1963). They met in Moscow, as both of them were in exile in the Soviet Union. He was also under the influence of other leftist poets and men of letters like the Russian poet Vladimir Mayakovsky (1893-1930), the French surrealist poet Louis Aragon (1897-1982), the Spanish poet and playwright Federico Garcia Lorca (1898-1936) and the Chilean poet and politician Pablo Neruda (1904-1973).

Works

Original volumes 

Mala'ika wa shayatin (Angels and Devils), 1950
Abariq muhashshama, 1954
Risala ila Hazim Hikmet wa quas'aid ukhra, 1956
Al-Majd li al-atfal wa al-zaytun, 1956
Ash'ar fi al-manfa, 1957
Ishrun qasida min Berlin, 1959
Kalimat la tamut, 1960
Muhakama fi Nisabur, 1963
Al-Nar wa al-kalimat, 1964
Sifr al-faqr wa al-thawra, 1965
Alladhi ya'ti wa laya'ti, 1966
Al Mawt fi al Hayat, 1968
Tajribati al-shi'riyya, 1968
'Ulyun al-kilab al-mayyita, 1969
Buka'iyya ila shams haziran wa al-murtaziqa, 1969
Al Kitaba al Teen, 1970
Yawmiyyat siyasi muhtarif, 1970
Qasaid hubb 'ala bawwabat al-'alam al-sab, 1971
Sira dhatiyya li sariq al-nar, 1974
Kitab al-bahr, 1974
Qamar Shiraz, 1976
Mamlakat al-sunbula, 1979
Sawt al-sanawat al-daw'iyya, 1979
Bustan 'A'isha, 1989
Al-Bahr Ba'id, Asma'uh Yatanahhud (The Sea is Distant, I Hear It Sighing), 1998

Translated volumes 

Lilies and Death, 1972 (trans. Mohammed B. Alwan)
The Singer and the Moon, 1976 (trans. Abdullah al-Udhari)
Eye of the Sun, 1978
Love Under Rain (Al-hubb tahta al-matar), 1985 (transl. Desmond Stewart and George Masri)
Love, Death, and Exile, 1990 (trans. Bassam K. Frangieh)

Anthologies with only works by Abd al-Wahhab Al-Bayati 

Poet of Iraq: Abdul Wahab al-Bayati. An introductory essay with translations by Desmond Stewart, 1976
Abdul Wahab al-Bayati, 1979 (a short introduction and four poems, trans. Desmond Stewart and George Masri)

Anthologies with works by Abd al-Wahhab Al-Bayati and other poets 

Abdullah al-Udhari, ed. and trans. Modern Poetry of the Arab World. Harmondsworth, UK: Penguin, 1986.
An Apology for a Short Speech
The Arab Refugee
The Fugitive
Hamlet
Profile of the Lover of the Great Bear
To Ernest Hemingway
Salma Khadra Jayyusi, ed. Modern Arabic Poetry: An Anthology. New York: Columbia University Press, 1987
The Birth of Aisha and Her Death
Eligy for Aisha
The Impossible
Luzumiyya
Simawe, Saadi ed. Iraqi Poetry Today,  London: King's College, London, 2003
The Dragon
An Elegy to Aisha
I am Born and I Burn in My Love
Love Under The Rain
The Nightmare
Nine Ruba'iyat
Shiraz Moon
Three Ruba'iyat
To Naguib Mahfouz [Amman, 15 April 1997]
To TS Eliot
Transformations of Aisha: Aisha's Birth and Death in the Magical Rituals Inscribed in Cuneiform on the Nineveh Tablets
Two Poems for my son, Ali
Who Owns the Homeland?
Writing on Aisha's Tomb

See also

The Dragon (poem), by Al-Bayati.

Further reading 

Azouqa, Aida. "Defamiliarization in the Poetry of ‘Abd al-Wahhab al-Bayati and T.S. Eliot: a comparative study." Journal of Arabic Literature 32.2 (2001): 167–211.
Boullata, Issa J. "The Masks of ‘Abd al-Wahhab al-Bayyati." Journal of Arabic Literature 32.2 (2001): 107–118.
Kadhim, Hussein N. "‘Abd al-Wahhab al-Wahhab al-Bayyati’s ‘Odes to Jaffa’." Journal of Arabic Literature 32.2 (2001): 86–106.
Musawi, Muhsin Jasim. "Abd al-Wahhab al-Bayati’s Poetics of Exile." Journal of Arabic Literature 32.2 (2001): 212–238
Musawi, Muhsin Jasim. "Engaging Tradition in Modern Arab Poetics." Journal of Arabic literature 33.2 (2002): 172–210.
Noorani, Yaseen "Visual Modernism in the Poetry of ‘Abd al-al-Wahhab al-Bayati." Journal of Arabic Literature 32.3 (2001): 239–255.
Rizk, Kahali Shukrallah. The Poetry of ‘Abd Al-Wahhab Al-Bayyati: thematic and stylistic study, Dissertation (Ph. D), Indiana University: 1981.
Salama, Mohammad R. "The Mise-en-Scene of ‘Writintg’ in al-Bayati's Al-Kitabah ‘ala al-tin ‘Writing on the Mud’." Journal of Arabic Literature 32.2 (2001): 167–211.
Stetkevych, Suzanne Pinckney. "Perhaps a Poet is Born, or Dies: the poetics of ‘Abd al—Wahhab al- Bayyati." Journal of Arabic Literature 32.2 (2001): 88–238.
Stewart, Desmond, editor and translator. Poet of Iraq, Abdul Wahab al-Bayati, an introductory essay with translations. Gazelle Publication: 1976.

Notes

References
Ryding, Karin C. - "A Reference Grammar of Modern Standard Arabic", Page 88, Section 5, "Nouns of intensity, repetition, profession", Cambridge University Press, © Karin C. Ryding 2005
Author Unknown. "1958: Coup in Iraq Sparks Jitters in the Middle East" BBC 14 July 1958. Accessed 1 May 2005.
This site is an archived BBC article on the military coup d'état in 1958 that allowed al-Bayyati to briefly return to Iraq.
Author Unknown. "An Interview With al-Bayyati" Al-Ahram Weekly February 1999. 13 April 2005
The author interviews al-Bayyati, who discusses with great feeling his ideas on the craft of writing, on religion, on women and on the politics that have shaped his life. This interview offers a charming glimpse of al-Bayatti's character, wit and personality. An extended obituary for al-Bayyati is also included at the bottom of the page.
Bahgory, George. "Abdel-Wahab al-Bayyati" Al-Ahram Weekly 18 August 1999. 13 April 2005
A short poem and drawing in memory of al-Bayyati by celebrated Egyptian artist and cartoonist George Bahgory.
Frangieh, Bassam. "Modern Arabic Poetry: Vision and Reality" Yale University Date Unavailable. 13 April 2005
This article examines work by modern Arabic poets in terms of historical and political events. It includes al-Bayyati's "Elegy to Aisha" with commentary.
Hegazi, Ahmed Abdel-Moeti. "Points of Reference" Al-Ahram Weekly 18 August 1999. 13 April 2005
Ahmed Abdel-Moeti Hegazi remembers al-Bayyati. This is an in-depth look at the poet from the perspective of a friend who had been acquainted with him for many years. It offers a fresh and enthralling view of al-Bayyati, and is by far the most personal article we have come across. This is the only example we have found of someone writing about al-Bayatti the man rather than al-Bayatii the poet. The site also includes a biography.

The text of this site, which appears in a few other locations on the web, includes a brief biographical overview of the author and a list of selected works. It discusses al-Bayyati's poetry in the context of his life, giving examples of poems influenced both by his politics, his separation from his homeland and his later Sufist influence. 
Ormsby, Eric. "Voices From the Wreckage" Maisonneuve May 2004. 12 April 2005.
Eric Ormsby eloquently describes seeing al-Bayyati read his poetry at a conference of Near Eastern poets, and reviews the book Iraqi Poetry Today. His review also offers an abridged historical commentary on the work of several poets included in the book.
Pollard, Lawrence. "How War Inspires the World's Poets" BBC 10 November 2002. 13 April 2005
A BBC special in honor of Remembrance Sunday, BBC World services correspondent Lawrence Pollard examines the ways that war inspires poets and writers the world over. The sit includes an extract from "Lament for the June Sun" by al-Bayyati with commentary.
Saleh, Fakhri. "al-Bayyati:A Great Innovator in the Language of Poetry" The Star 12 August 1999 HighBeam Research. 13 April 2005
An overview of al-Bayyati's life and poetry, written following his death. Unfortunately, membership to the site must be obtained to access the full text.

External links
Death of Abdul Wahab Al-Bayati, 73; Iraqi Poet and Innovator in His Art
Man and Woman English translation of one of Al-Bayyati's poems

1926 births
1999 deaths
20th-century Iraqi poets
Writers from Baghdad